Destination (stylized as DESTINATION) is the twenty second studio album by Japanese singer Akina Nakamori and third studio album to be released during the 2000s. It was released on 21 June 2006 under the Universal Music Japan label.

The album includes two Akina's original written songs: Yoru no Hana and Love Gate under pseudonym Miran:Miran.

The album jacket is taken from live pamphlet Femme Fatale in 1988.

Promotion

Singles
It consists of two previously released singles.

Rakka Ryūsui is the forty fifth single written by Takashi Matsumoto and Kenji Hayashida. It was released on 7 December 2005 under Universal Music Japan. It was her only single to be released in that year and first single to be released in 3 years. It was used as a theme song to the new-year historical television drama Tenka Sōran: Tokugawa Mitsuyo no inbō. The original version of the single was included in the compilation albums BEST FINGER 25th anniversary selection and All Time Best: Originals in 2014.

The single debuted at number 43 on Oricon Single Weekly Charts.

"Hana yo Odore" is the forty sixth single written by Hitoshi Haba. It was released on 17 May 2006 under Universal Music Japan. It was her only single to be released in that year and first single to be released in 3 years. The single was used as a theme song to the television drama series Primadam, in which Nakamori was cast in the minor role. The single version of the single was included in the compilation album All Time Best: Originals in 2014.

The single debuted at number 23 on Oricon Single Weekly Charts.

Stage performances
Nakamori performed Hana yo Odore, Game, Rakka Ryuusei, Love Gate, Kouya, Nemureru Mori no Cho, Grace Rain and Usotsuki in her final live tour Last Destination in 2006.

Chart performance
The album reached number 20 on the Oricon Album Weekly Chart charted for the 4 consecutive weeks with the sales of 10,300 copies.

Track listing

References

2006 albums
Japanese-language albums
Akina Nakamori albums
Universal Music Japan albums